The military budget of Iran is the portion of the country's overall budget that is allocated for the funding of the Iranian Armed Forces and the Ministry of Defense and Armed Forces Logistics.

Contributing factors 
Research shows that oil revenue has been a major economic factor on military spending of Iran and in the 1970s led to "petrodollar recycling".

A study investigating the impact of sanctions against Iran on the country's military spending, examining historical record between from 1960 to 2017 and using auto-regressive distributed lag model (ARDL), found that unilateral sanctions by the United States would have insignificant effect on Iran's expenditure while multilateral sanctions (imposed by the United Nations and the European Union in addition to the U.S.) would be statistically significant.

Estimates

Sources 
There are multiple sources estimating the military expenditure of Iran, however differences exist between the numbers. An example is a dispute among U.S. government agencies; while the Arms Control and Disarmament Agency (ACDA) estimated Iranian 1993 expenditure to be $4.9 billion, U.S. intelligence experts believed Iran had spent up to $8 billion that year. In 1995, the Central Intelligence Agency (CIA) concluded that it was unable to make accurate numbers using conversion of Iranian official reports in rial to U.S. dollar, the number in 1993 was 2,507 billion rials. Other sources estimating military budget of Iran include the International Institute for Strategic Studies (IISS) and the Stockholm International Peace Research Institute (SIPRI). Iranian The International Monetary Fund (IMF) also produces its own figures.

Under the Shah (until 1979) 
According to data compiled by Shahram Chubin and Sepehr Zabih, the estimated military expenditure of Iran from 1960 to 1972, in constant price of 1960 and with exchange rate of the same year, would be calculated as the following:

Morteza Gharehbaghian has compiled the following table based on Statistical Centre of Iran's consensus and various issues of SIPRI:

SIPRI annual estimates since 1960 
Source: SIPRI Military Expenditure Database

See also 

Iran’s public budget
 List of countries by military expenditures
 Past military expenditure by country
 List of countries by military expenditure per capita

References 

Military budgets
Military of Iran
Ministry of Defence and Armed Forces Logistics of the Islamic Republic of Iran